Ennio Panetti (born 4 December 1954) is an Italian male former long-distance runner who competed at two editions of the IAAF World Cross Country Championships at senior level (1979, 1980).

References

External links
 Ennio Panetti profile at Association of Road Racing Statisticians

1954 births
Living people
Italian male long-distance runners
Italian male cross country runners